The following is an alphabetical list of members of the United States House of Representatives from the state of New Jersey.  For chronological tables of members of both houses of the United States Congress from the state (through the present day), see United States congressional delegations from New Jersey. The list of names should be complete, but other data may be incomplete.

Current representatives 

 : Donald Norcross (D) (since 2014)
 : Jeff Van Drew (R) (since 2019)
 : Andy Kim (D) (since 2019)
 : Chris Smith (R) (since 1981)
 : Josh Gottheimer (D) (since 2017)
 : Frank Pallone (D) (since 1988)
 : Thomas Kean Jr. (R) (since 2023)
 : Rob Menendez (D) (since 2023)
 : Bill Pascrell (D) (since 1997)
 : Donald Payne Jr. (D) (since 2012)
 : Mikie Sherrill (D) (since 2019)
 : Bonnie Watson Coleman (D) (since 2015)

List of members of the House

Key

See also

List of United States senators from New Jersey
United States congressional delegations from New Jersey
New Jersey's congressional districts

Notes 

 House of Representatives List of Members

New Jersey
 
United States rep